The 1997 Chrono des Herbiers was the 16th edition of the Chrono des Nations cycle race and was held on 19 October 1997. The race started and finished in Les Herbiers. The race was won by Serhiy Honchar.

General classification

References

1997
1997 in road cycling
1997 in French sport